Cyclamen rhodium (also called Cyclamen peloponnesiacum; once included in Cyclamen repandum) is a species of flowering plant in genus Cyclamen of the family Primulaceae, native to the Peloponnese, Rhodes, and southwestern Kos. Like all cyclamens, the flowers consist of five upswept, reflexed petals.

Subspecies

There are three subspecies, distinguished by range and flower color.

Cyclamen rhodium subsp. rhodium is white or pale pink with a pink nose and grows in shaded woodland and shrubland on the islands of Rhodes and Kos.

Cyclamen rhodium subsp. peloponnesiacum  J. Compton & Culham is pink with a deep carmine-pink mouth and grows in shaded woodland in the Taygetus Mountains in the southern Peloponnese and near Mt. Aroania in the north.

Cyclamen rhodium subsp. vividum  J. Compton & Culham is deep carmine-magenta and grows in sunny areas on the southeastern coast of the Peloponnese.

Former names
Cyclamen rhodium was once called Cyclamen peloponnesiacum; before that, it was included in Cyclamen repandum. The subspecies of Cyclamen rhodium were classified thus:
Cyclamen repandum
subsp. rhodense
subsp. peloponnesiacum var. peloponnesiacum
subsp. peloponnesiacum var. vividum
Cyclamen peloponnesiacum Kit Tan
subsp. rhodense
subsp. peloponnesiacum
subsp. vividum

References

External links

Cyclamen Society (as Cyclamen repandum subsp. peloponnesiacum and subsp. rhodense)
Pacific Bulb Society (as Cyclamen repandum subsp. peloponnesiacum)

photos from trip to Peloponnese — Northumberland Alpine Gardener's Diary (middle of page)

rhodium